The Czech National Chess Championship is the chess competition held to determine the best chess player from the Czech Republic.

History

First national championships were held every second year, as the championships of Bohemia (within the Austro-Hungarian Empire), between 1905 and 1913, before the founding of independent Czechoslovakia. Afterwards, the independent Czech Republic's championships continued the tradition.

 1905–13 – championships of Bohemia
 1940–44 – championships of Bohemia and Moravia
 1993–present – championships of the Czech Republic

List of winners

Championships of Bohemia
{| class="sortable wikitable"
! Year !! City !! Winner
|-
| 1905 || Prague || Oldřich Duras
|-
| 1907 || Brno || František Treybal
|-
| 1909 || Prague || Oldřich Duras
|-
| 1911 || Plzeň || Oldřich Duras
|-
| 1913 || Mladá Boleslav || Karel Hromádka
|}

Championships of Bohemia and Moravia
(in the years of World War II)

{| class="sortable wikitable"
! Year !! City !! Winner
|-
| 1940 || Rakovník || Jan Foltys
|-
| 1943 || Prague || František Zíta
|-
| 1944 || Brno || Karel Opočenský
|}

Championships of the Czech Republic
{| class="sortable wikitable"
! Year !! City !! Winner
!City
!Woman Champion
|-
| 1993 || Luhačovice         || Vlastimil Babula
|Tišnov
|Petra Krupková
|-
| 1994 || Ústí nad Labem     || Zbyněk Hráček
|Nymburk
|Lenka Ptáčníková
|-
| 1995 || Olomouc            || Karel Mokrý
|Olomouc
|Silvie Šaljová
|-
| 1996 || Turnov             || Petr Hába
|Ústí nad Labem
|Lenka Ptáčníková
|-
| 1997 || Zlín               || Pavel Blatný
|Ostrava
|Gabriela Hitzgerová
|-
| 1998 || Zlín               || Sergei Movsesian
|Klatovy
|Gabriela Hitzgerová
|-
| 1999 || Lázně Bohdaneč     || Marek Vokáč
|Klatovy
|Silvie Šaljová
|-
| 2000 || Opava              || Pavel Blatný
|
|
|-
| 2001 || Kunžak             || Eduard Meduna
|Třinec
|Olga Sikorová
|-
| 2002 || Ostrava            || Petr Hába
|Frymburk
|Olga Sikorová
|-
| 2003 || Luhačovice         || Miloš Jirovský
|Luhačovice
|Kateřina Čedíková
|-
| 2004 || Karlovy Vary       || David Navara
|Karlovy Vary
|Olga Sikorová
|-
| 2005 || Karlovy Vary       || David Navara
|
|
|-
| 2006 || Brno               || Viktor Láznička
|
|
|-
| 2007 || Prague             || Tomáš Polák
|
|
|-
| 2008 || Havlíčkův Brod     || Vlastimil Babula
|Havlíčkův Brod
|Kateřina Němcová
|-
| 2009 || Děčín              || Pavel Šimáček
|Děčín
|Kateřina Čedíková
|-
| 2010 || Ostrava            || David Navara
|Ostrava
|Kateřina Němcová
|-
| 2011 || Pardubice          || Jiří Štoček
|Pardubice
|Karolína Olšarová
|-
| 2012 || Kouty nad Desnou   ||  David Navara
|Kouty nad Desnou
|Tereza Olšarová
|-
| 2013 ||  Ledec nad Sazavou ||  David Navara
|Ledec nad Sazavou
|Martina Marečková
|-
| 2014 || Ostrava            ||  David Navara
|Ostrava
|Olga Sikorová
|-
| 2015 || Havlíčkův Brod || David Navara
|Havličkův Brod
|Tereza Olšarová
|-
| 2016 || Ostrava || Vojtěch Plát
|Ostrava 
|Joanna Worek
|-
| 2017 || Ostrava || David Navara
|Ostrava 
|Kristýna Havlíková 
|-
| 2018 || Ostrava || Svatopluk Svoboda
|České Budějovice 
|Olga Sikorová
|-
| 2019 || Ostrava || David Navara
|Prague
|Karolína Olšarová
|-
|2020
|
|
|Frydek Mistek
|Kristýna Petrová 
|-
|2021
|
|
|
|
|-
|2022
|Ústí nad Labem
|David Navara
|Jaroměřice nad Rokytnou
|Nataša Richterová 
|}

Multiple winners
The Czech Chess Union and Czech chess press count all Czech and Czechoslovak titles together, with the resulting ranking as follows:

11 titles: David Navara (2004–2022)
7 titles: Luděk Pachman (1946–1966)
6 titles: Vlastimil Hort (1969–1977)
5 titles: Ľubomír Ftáčnik (1981–1989)
3 titles: Oldřich Duras (1905–1911), Miroslav Filip (1950–1954), Vlastimil Jansa (1964–1984), Karel Opočenský (1927–1938), Jan Smejkal (1973–1986)

Women
{| class="sortable wikitable"
! Year !! City !! Winner
|-
| 1993 ||Tišnov||Petra Krupková
|-
| 1994 || Nymburk            || Lenka Ptáčníková
|-
| 1994 || Chrudim            || Hana Kubíková
|-
| 1995 || Olomouc            ||Silvie Šaljová
|-
| 1996 ||Ústí nad Labem||Lenka Ptáčníková
|-
| 1997 || Ostrava            || Gabriela Hitzgerová
|-
| 1998 || Klatovy            || Gabriela Hitzgerová
|-
| 1999 || Klatovy            ||Silvie Šaljová
|-
| 2001 ||Třinec||Olga Sikorová
|-
| 2002 || Frymburk          || Olga Sikorová
|-
| 2003 ||Luhačovice||Kateřina Čedíková
|-
| 2004 || Karlovy Vary       || Olga Sikorová
|-
| 2008 ||Havlíčkův Brod||Kateřina Němcová
|-
| 2009 || Děčín              || Kateřina Čedíková
|-
| 2010 || Ostrava            || Kateřina Němcová
|-
| 2011 || Pardubice          || Karolína Olšarová
|-
| 2012 || Kouty nad Desnou   ||Tereza Olšarová
|-
| 2013 ||  Ledec nad Sazavou || Martina Marečková
|-
| 2014 || Ostrava            ||Olga Sikorová
|-
| 2015 ||Havličkův Brod||Tereza Olšarová
|-
| 2016 || Ostrava            || Joanna Worek
|-
| 2017 || Ostrava            || Kristýna Havlíková 
|-
| 2018 || České Budějovice   ||Olga Sikorová
|-
| 2019 || Prague    || Karolína Olšarová
|}

References

Bibliography
Modr, Břetislav; Veselý, Jiří. 100 let organizovaného šachu v českých zemích. Příbram, 2005. .

See also
Czechoslovak Chess Championship

Chess national championships
Women's chess national championships
Championship
Chess